Dufourea versatilis is a species of sweat bee in the family Halictidae. It is found in North America.

Subspecies
These two subspecies belong to the species Dufourea versatilis:
 Dufourea versatilis rubriventris Michener, 1951
 Dufourea versatilis versatilis (Bridwell, 1919)

References

Further reading

 

 Dufourea versatilis
 COLLECTIONS OF DUFOUREA VERSATILIS

Halictidae
Articles created by Qbugbot
Insects described in 1919